Kiteworld is a novel by Keith Roberts published in 1985.

Plot summary
Kiteworld is a novel in which men fly in kites at the borders of their land to defend against demons of legend.

Reception
Dave Langford reviewed Kiteworld for White Dwarf #69, and stated that "Superlative stuff, even if the deux-ex-machina happy ending is a bit jarring."

Reviews
Review by Chris Morgan (1985) in Fantasy Review, July 1985
Review by Faren Miller (1985) in Locus, #295 August 1985
Review by Chris Bailey (1985) in Vector 128
Review by Mary Gentle (1985) in Interzone, #14 Winter 1985/86
Review by M. John Harrison (1985) in Foundation, #35 Winter 1985/1986, (1986)
Review by Don D'Ammassa (1986) in Science Fiction Chronicle, #85 October 1986

References

1985 novels
Books about kite flying